Ross Munro may refer to:
 Ross Munro (journalist)
 Ross Munro (footballer)